Laugh Comics was a comic book produced by Archie Comics in two volumes, from 1946 to 1987 and 1987 to 1991. The title showcased some of the early appearances of the "Archie gang." Beginning with issue #145, Josie began making semi-regular appearances (some of her earliest), with art by Dan DeCarlo.

Publication history 
The title began with issue #20, continuing the numbering of Black Hood Comics. Laugh Comics vol. 1 concluded with issue #400 in 1987.

A second volume, titled simply Laugh, appeared a few months later, lasting 29 issues until August 1991.

See also 
 Laugh Comics Digest

Defunct American comics
Archie Comics titles
1946 comics debuts
1991 comics endings
Magazines established in 1946
Magazines disestablished in 1991
Teen comedy comics
Romantic comedy comics
Bimonthly magazines published in the United States